Bourland Field  is a public airport located seventeen miles (27.4 km) southwest of the central business district (CBD) of Fort Worth, in Parker County, Texas, United States. It was developed by Richard Bourland in September 1981 for whom the airport is named. In addition to serving as a public-use airport for southeastern Parker County, the airport also serves as an airpark for the attached housing development known as Bourland Field Estates.

The airport is used solely for general aviation purposes, including aircraft rental and flight training.

Facilities

Bourland Field covers 140 acres (56.7 ha) at an elevation of 873 feet (266.1 m) above mean sea level (AMSL) and has one runway:
 Runway 17/35: 4,049 x 60 ft. (1,234 x 18 m), Surface: Asphalt
For the 12-month period ending December 31, 2018, the airport had 46,800 aircraft operations, an average of 128 per day. At that time, there were 100 single-engine planes, 15 multi-engine planes, two jets, and one helicopter based at the airport. Both 100LL avgas and JetA are available, and the airport hosts several tie-downs, a community hangar, and t-hangars.

References

External links 

 Bourland Field, official website
 "Fort Worth, Bourland Field (50F)" (PDF) at Texas DOT Airport Directory

Airports in the Dallas–Fort Worth metroplex
Transportation in Parker County, Texas
Buildings and structures in Parker County, Texas